Victor Charles Goldbloom  (July 31, 1923 – February 15, 2016) was a Canadian pediatrician, lecturer, and politician.

Early life and education
He was born in Montreal, the son of Alton Goldbloom and Annie Ballon. He studied at Selwyn House School and Lower Canada College. He studied at McGill University receiving his BSc in 1944, his MD in 1945, his DipEd in 1950 and his DLitt in 1992. Dr. Goldbloom was assistant resident at the Babies' Hospital of the Columbia Presbyterian Medical Center, in New York.

Career
He was elected in 1966 as the MNA for the Montreal riding of D'Arcy-McGee. He was re-elected in 1970, 1973, and 1976. While Robert Bourassa was Premier of Quebec, Goldbloom was Minister of State responsible for Quality of Environment (1970–73). In 1973, he was appointed Minister of Municipal Affairs as well as Quebec's first Minister of the Environment, serving in both positions until the Liberal government's defeat in 1976. Goldbloom was in charge of the Olympic Installations Board for the 1976 Summer Olympics in Montreal.

He was the first member of the Jewish community to become a cabinet minister in the Quebec government. He kept his seat in the 1976 provincial election that defeated the Liberal government and sat on the Opposition benches until he resigned his seat on October 16, 1979 after Claude Ryan became Liberal leader.

Subsequently, from 1980 to 1987, he was CEO of the Canadian Council of Christians and Jews.

From 1991 until 1999, he was Canada's fourth Commissioner of Official Languages. During his tenure, Commissioner Goldbloom conducted two comprehensive studies. The first study examined the availability of services in both official languages in offices designated bilingual, which concluded that the federal government's bilingualism was not yet fully implemented nor functional. The second study focused on the implementation of Part VII of the Official Languages Act  by the federal government and suggested different ways that Section 41 of the Official Languages Act could be implemented. In this report, Goldbloom suggested assigning a role of Coordinator of Language Policy at the Privy Council Office.

In 2009, he expressed   concerns on the state of Catholic-Jewish relations after the lifting of the excommunications of the bishops of the Society of Saint Pius X. Goldbloom died of a heart attack at Montreal in February 2016.

Family
In June 1948, he married Sheila (born Barshay-Rothstein) of Peekskill, New York. His sons are Michael Goldbloom, Principal and Vice-Chancellor of Bishop's University and former publisher of the Toronto Star and the Montreal Gazette, and Jonathan Goldbloom, founder and president of Jonathan Goldbloom & Associates. His daughter, Susan Restler, lives in Brooklyn, New York.

Honours
 Officer of the Order of Canada (1983),   was promoted to Companion in 2000.
 Officer of the National Order of Quebec. (1991)
 Honorary Doctorate from the University of Ottawa.(1994)
 Honorary Doctorate from the Université Sainte-Anne at Church Point (Pointe de l'Église), Nova Scotia (1996)
 James H. Graham Award of the Royal College of Physicians and Surgeons of Canada (1996)
 Knight of the Order of St. Sylvester  (2012)

Sheila and Victor Goldbloom Distinguished Community Service Award 
In June 2009, the Quebec Community Groups Network (QCGN) established the Sheila and Victor Goldbloom Distinguished Community Service Award in their honor.

In September 2009, the first awards were presented to lawyer and longtime promoter of quality and English rights Casper Bloom, Eastern Townships-based health-care advocate Marjorie Goodfellow, and researcher Jack Jedwab, who has contributed   to the knowledge and understanding of English-speaking Quebec.

Electoral record

|-

|-
|}

|-

|-

|-

|-
|}

|-

|-

|Democratic Alliance
|Elie Chalouh
|align="right"|950	
|align="right"|3.04
|align="right"|–
|-
 
|Independent
|Max Wollach
|align="right"|417
|align="right"|1.33
|align="right"|–
|-

|-
|}

References

External links
 The Great Names of the French-Canadian Community
 Multicultural Canada, article in the Canadian Jewish Review on Goldbloom's wedding, June 25, 1948
 
 Victor Goldbloom: Eminent Quebecker brought people together Globe and Mail obituary by Lisa Fitterman, Feb.28, 2016

1923 births
2016 deaths
Anglophone Quebec people
Commissioners of Official Languages (Canada)
Canadian pediatricians
Companions of the Order of Canada
Jewish Canadian politicians
Knights of the Order of St. Sylvester
McGill University Faculty of Medicine alumni
Officers of the National Order of Quebec
Physicians from Montreal
Politicians from Montreal
Quebec Liberal Party MNAs
Canadian expatriates in the United States